The Gonypetidae are a new (2019) family of praying mantids, based on the type genus Gonypeta.  The name was created by Westwood and it has been revived as part of a major revision of mantid taxonomy; the subfamily Iridopteryginae having been moved here from the obsolete family Iridopterygidae.  The Gonypetinae include Asian genera transferred from the obsolete taxa Amelinae and Liturgusidae.

The new placement is in superfamily Gonypetoidea (of group Cernomantodea) and infraorder Schizomantodea.  Genera in this family have been recorded from: NE Africa, the Middle East, India, Indochina, Malesia through to New Guinea.

Subfamilies, tribes and genera  
The Mantodea Species File lists two subfamilies:

Gonypetinae 
 tribe Armenini
 Armene Stal, 1877
 tribe Gonypetini
 subtribe Compsomantina
 Compsomantis Saussure, 1872
 subtribe Gonypetina
 Bimantis Giglio-Tos, 1915
 Dimantis Giglio-Tos, 1915
 Elaea Stal, 1877
 Elmantis Giglio-Tos, 1915
 Gimantis Giglio-Tos, 1915
 Gonypeta Saussure, 1869
 Gonypetoides Beier, 1942
 Memantis Giglio-Tos, 1915
 Myrcinus Stal, 1877
 subtribe Gonypetyllina
 Armeniola Giglio-Tos, 1915
 Gonypetyllis Wood-Mason, 1891
 Holaptilon Beier, 1964
 subtribe Humbertiellina
 Humbertiella Saussure, 1869
 Paratheopompa Schwarz & Ehrmann, 2017
 Theopompa Stal, 1877

Iridopteryginae 
 tribe Amantini
 Amantis Giglio-Tos, 1915
 tribe Iridopterygini
 subtribe Iridopterygina
 Hapalopeza Stal, 1877
 Hapalopezella Giglio-Tos, 1915
 Iridopteryx Saussure, 1869
 Micromantis Saussure, 1870
 Muscimantis Henry, 1931
 Pezomantis Uvarov, 1927
 Spilomantis Giglio-Tos, 1915
 subtribe Tricondylomimina
 Tricondylomimus Chopard, 1930

References

External links 

Mantodea families
Gonypetidae